Tom Parker may refer to:

Music
Colonel Tom Parker (1909–1997), Dutch musical entrepreneur, manager of Elvis Presley
Tom Parker (musician) (1944–2013), British musician
Tom Parker (singer) (1988–2022), British singer, member of The Wanted

Sports
Tom Parker (baseball) (1912–1964), American baseball player
Tom Parker (basketball) (born 1950), American basketball player
Tom Parker (footballer, born 1893) (1893–?), English footballer
Tom Parker (footballer, born 1897) (1897–1987), English football player and manager
Tom Parker (rugby union) (1891–1967), Welsh international rugby player

Others
Tom Parker (judge) (born 1951), American judge
Tom Parker or Grover Gardner (born 1956), American audiobook narrator

See also
Thomas Parker (disambiguation)
Tommy Parker (disambiguation)
Parker (surname)